Dialommus is a genus of labrisomid blennies native to the eastern Pacific Ocean.

Species
There are currently two recognized species in this genus:
 Dialommus fuscus C. H. Gilbert, 1891 (Galápagos four-eyed blenny)
 Dialommus macrocephalus (Günther, 1861) (Foureye rockskipper)

References

 
Labrisomidae